Mikulovice is a municipality and village in Pardubice District in the Pardubice Region of the Czech Republic. It has about 1,300 inhabitants.

Administrative parts
The village of Blato is an administrative part of Mikulovice.

References

External links

 

Villages in Pardubice District